was .

Life 

Shō Ten was born in Shuri and was from birth crown prince to the Ryukyu Kingdom. He underwent his coming-of-age ceremony in 1878 and was married the same year. In March 1879, his father Shō Tai formally abdicated upon the orders of the Meiji government, which abolished the kingdom, transforming Ryukyu domain into Okinawa Prefecture, with officials appointed from Tokyo to administer the islands. The former king was ordered to report to Tokyo, but feigning illness, he temporarily found shelter at his son's palace. Shō was then sent to Tokyo as a hostage and partial appeasement as Ryūkyūan officials searched for ways to delay the former king's departure.

Following his father's death and his succession as Marquess and head of the Shō family in 1901, Shō and his family gave up the trappings of traditional Ryukyuan royal court life, costume, court language, and ritual, and adopted those of the Japanese peerage. As Marquess, Shō held a hereditary seat in the House of Peers in the Imperial Diet. He was joined in representing Okinawa by a Japanese resident appointed to represent the prefecture's wealthiest taxpayers for the first time in 1918.

Shō died on 20 September 1920, in his mansion in Shuri and was entombed six days later in Tamaudun, the royal mausoleum near Shuri Castle, in accordance with traditional Ryukyuan royal funerary rites. He would be the last member of the Shō family to be honored in such a manner.

Family
The family head was succeeded by his eldest son Shō Shō, then by Hiroshi Shō and the current incumbent, Mamoru Shō.

 Father: Shō Tai
 Mother: Omomatsurugane, Sashiki Aji-ganashi
 Wife: Shoko, Nodake Aji-ganashi
 Children:
Shō Shō (b.1888)
 Nobuko (b. ?) engaged to Nakijin Tomohide
 Sho Kei (b.1889)
 Sho Dan (b.1890)
 Sho Bu (b.1899)

References 

1864 births
1920 deaths
People from Naha
Princes of Ryūkyū
Second Shō dynasty
Kazoku
Members of the House of Peers (Japan)
People of Meiji-period Japan
Pretenders
Heirs apparent who never acceded